Ansar al-Din may refer to:
 Ansar Dine, an Islamist militant organization based in Mali.
 Ansar al-Din Front, an Islamist militant organization based in Syria.